The Palaeontological Association (PalAss for short) is a charitable organisation based in the UK founded in 1957 for the promotion of the study of palaeontology and allied sciences.

Publications 
The Association publishes two main journals: Palaeontology and Papers in Palaeontology. The latter is the successor to the now discontinued Special Papers in Palaeontology. In addition, the Palaeontology Newsletter is published 3 times per year, and the Field Guides to Fossils series covering important palaeontological biotas is published in book form.

Awards
The Association confers a number of awards, including the Gertrude Elles Award for high-quality public engagement; the Mary Anning Award for outstanding contributions from those not professionally employed in palaeontology; the Hodson Award for exceptional early-career achievement; the President's Medal as a mid-career award; and the organisation's highest award for exceptional lifetime achievement, the Lapworth Medal.

Hodson Awardees 
Source: Paleontological Association

References

External links
 Palaeontological Association

British Geological Survey
Scientific societies based in the United Kingdom
Organisations based in Nottinghamshire
Paleontological institutions and organizations
1957 establishments in the United Kingdom
Paleontology in the United Kingdom
Professional associations based in the United Kingdom
Science and technology in Nottinghamshire
Scientific organizations established in 1957